King's Highway 20, commonly referred to as Highway 20, is a provincially maintained highway in the Canadian province of Ontario. Presently, it is a short  stub between Highway 58 and Niagara Regional Road 70 in the City of Thorold, but until 1997 it connected Hamilton to Niagara Falls, serving several towns atop the Niagara Escarpment en route.

Highway 20 was first designated in 1930, serving as a bypass to the congested Highway 8. Soon after, a new cut was made into the Niagara Escarpment south of Stoney Creek, which would serve Highway 20 for 66 years. However, the new route failed to divert a significant amount of traffic from Highway 8. Subsequently, the Queen Elizabeth Way (QEW) was constructed through the Niagara Peninsula between 1937 and 1940. The opening of the Burlington Bay Skyway in 1958 bypassed the routing of Highway 20; it was truncated at the QEW in Stoney Creek in 1964 as a result. The routing remained unchanged between then and 1998, when all but a short stub of the highway was transferred to regional jurisdiction.

Route description 
While today Highway20 is a mere  stub of its former length, most of the former route retains the same layout and character as the highway did prior to 1998, serving as the main street of the villages of Fonthill and Smithville.
At Allanburg, Highway20 crossed the Welland Canal utilizing the Allanburg Bridge, or Bridge11, a vertical lift bridge which opened to traffic in the spring of 1930 shortly after Highway20 was first opened.
The remaining portion of the highway is mostly rural in nature, although numerous motels line the short stretch of roadway, reminiscent of a bygone era.

Highway20 begins at a signalized intersection with Highway58, which proceeds north and west from there. Moving eastward, a majority of motels line the south side of the highway, as do several residences and a strip club.
At Thorold Townline Road (Regional Road70), Highway20 ends while the roadway continues eastward into the city of Niagara Falls as Lundy's Lane,
named for William Lundy (1741–1829), a United Empire Loyalist from Berks County.

Former route (1997) 
Prior to being transferred almost entirely in 1997 and 1998, Highway20 provided an alternative route to Highway8 and the QEW south of the Niagara Escarpment. Beginning at an interchange with the QEW at Centennial Parkway, the highway travelled south, providing access to communities within Stoney Creek. After intersecting Highway8 (Queenston Road), it ascended the Niagara Escarpment. At Elfrida, Highway20 intersected Highway 53, which travelled west to Brantford, as well as Highway 56, which travelled south to Binbrook and Highway3; Highway20 turned east at this intersection.

The route exited Hamilton–Wentworth at Westbrook Road, entering the Region of Niagara and the municipality of West Lincoln after a brief swerve southward. It passed through the communities of Fulton, Kimbo and Allen's Corners before curving southeast into the town of Smithville. Southeast of the town, it curved south near St. Anns to Bismarck, where traffic had to turn to remain on the highway, which switched from a southward to eastward direction. At Niagara Regional Road24 (Victoria Avenue), the route entered the town of Pelham. It served as the primary east–west route through the community of Fonthill, where it curved northeast.

After meeting Highway406 and Highway58 (then an at-grade two-lane intersection), Highway20 curved east to cross the Welland Canal. Now known as Lundy's Lane, it swerved north before meeting the present portion of the route. East of the Thorold–Niagara Falls boundary at Niagara Regional Road70, the highway zig-zagged northeast into the urban area of Niagara Falls. Provincial maintenance ended at Montrose Road prior to 1998,
with it continuing east as a Connecting Link. It crossed the QEW before becoming known as Ferry Street at the intersection with Main Street. As it approached the tourist district, it curved northeast and became Victoria Avenue. It turned down Clifton Hill and then north onto Falls Avenue, ending at the Rainbow Bridge.

History 

Highway20 was first designated on March12, 1930,
with its western terminus at the intersection of Highway8 (Main Street) and Highway6 (John Street) in downtown Hamilton. It proceeded south along John Street, concurrently with Highway6, to the foot of the Niagara Escarpment, where the two routes split. Highway20 climbed the escarpment through the Jolley Cut, while Highway6 used the Claremont Access. At the top, Highway20 proceeded east along Concession Street, then south along Upper Gage Avenue to Rymal Road. From there, the route turned east and followed Rymal Road to Elfrida and onwards to its eastern terminus at the Honeymoon Bridge Niagara Falls.

Soon thereafter, the Department of Highways (DHO) began to excavate a new cut into the escarpment between Elfrida and Stoney Creek. While under construction in 1931, Highway20 was rerouted onto what would become known as Centennial Parkway, briefly ending at a junction between Highway8 and Highway8A (the present day intersection of Queenston Road and Centennial Parkway); the old routing from Elfrida to downtown Hamilton was renumbered as Highway20A.
The highway descended the escarpment along the now-closed Glover Mountain Road, which connected the modern Greenhill Avenue with First Road. Highway8A meanwhile, proceeded north from Stoney Creek to Burlington via Burlington Beach; it was renumbered as an extension of Highway20 when the Stoney Creek Cut was completed in 1932. At the same time, the highway was shifted from Glover Mountain Road to the new Centennial Parkway.

Between Welland and Niagara Falls, Highway3 originally followed the Merrittville Highway (later Highway58) and Lundy's Lane to the Honeymoon Bridge; Highway3A connected Port Colborne to Fort Erie. In 1929, the two route numbers were switched,
as traffic pattern had shifted to make use of the new Peace Bridge. After Highway20 was designated, the Highway3A designation was superseded between Allanburg and Niagara Falls.

Between Hamilton and Welland, several major diversions were constructed during the 1930s, including west of Elfrida (the old route followed South Townline Road and Chapel Hill Road), east of Kimbo (the old route now known as Kimbo Road) and around St. Anns (having originally followed Twenty Mile Creek Road and St. Anns Road).
In 1938, construction began on a large traffic circle between Highway20 and the QEW in Stoney Creek and on a cloverleaf with Lundy's Lane in Niagara Falls;
both were completed prior to the opening of the QEW on August23, 1940. Highway20 was now , its peak length.

Both the QEW and Highway20 crossed the entrance to Hamilton Harbour utilizing a four lane lift bridge. However, this quickly became one of the two major bottlenecks along the new superhighway. By the early-1950s, traffic lineups often stretched for several kilometres each time the bridge raised. This prompted the DHO to construct a skyway over the canal, which opened on October30, 1958, and provided four lanes of uninterrupted travel.
Subsequently, the use of Highway20 (now Beach Boulevard) for long-distance travel ceased.

As part of a series of budget cuts initiated by premier Mike Harris under his Common Sense Revolution platform in 1995, numerous highways deemed to no longer be of significance to the provincial network were decommissioned and responsibility for the routes transferred to a lower level of government, a process referred to as downloading. On January1, 1998, the province downloaded the majority of Highway20 to the Regional Municipalities of Hamilton and Niagara. However, a short section remains, connecting Highway58 to the city boundary of Thorold and Niagara Falls.
It is unclear why this short portion was retained in the provincial highway network.

Major intersections

References

Sources

Bibliography

External links 

020
Roads in the Regional Municipality of Niagara
Roads in Niagara Falls, Ontario
Thorold